"Gravity" is a single by the Japanese rock band Nothing's Carved in Stone released on January 14, 2015.

Track listing

References 

2015 singles
2015 songs
Epic Records singles